Brockbank is a surname. Notable people with the surname include:

Andy Brockbank, retired English footballer
Bernard P. Brockbank (1909–2000), LDS church official
Chris Brockbank, English rugby league footballer and coach
Harry Brockbank, English footballer
John Brockbank (1848–1896)
Russell Brockbank (1913–1979), Canadian-born UK cartoonist

See also
Brockbank Jr high, a school in Utah, United States